Karik or Kerik or Kareyak or Kariak may refer to:
 Kareyak, Kohgiluyeh and Boyer-Ahmad
 Kerik, North Khorasan

See also

Karie (disambiguation)
Karlik (disambiguation)